Iñaki Olaortua Descarga (born 3 August 1993) is a Spanish footballer who plays as a centre back for CD Atlético Baleares

Club career
Born in Elgeta, Gipuzkoa, Basque Country, Olaortua graduated with SD Eibar's youth setup, and made his debuts with the reserves in Tercera División. He subsequently served loan deals at fellow fourth division sides CD Anaitasuna and Zamudio SD before being released in 2014.

On 15 June 2014 Olaortua joined Club Portugalete, also in the fourth tier. After achieving promotion to Segunda División B he moved to Real Zaragoza, being assigned to the B-team in the fourth level.

On 15 October 2015 Olaortua made his professional debut, starting and scoring an own goal in a 1–2 Copa del Rey home loss against UE Llagostera. In July of the following year, he moved to third level club SD Amorebieta.

On 17 July 2017, Olaortua joined Barakaldo CF still in the third division. The following 16 June, he signed for fellow league team Racing de Santander, and achieved promotion to the second level in his first season.

On 1 October 2020, Olaortua was presented at third division side CD Atlético Baleares along with his wife Maialen Esnaola, who joined to club to play for their women's team.

References

External links
Portugalete profile 

1993 births
Living people
People from Mondragón
Sportspeople from Gipuzkoa
Spanish footballers
Footballers from the Basque Country (autonomous community)
Association football defenders
Tercera División players
SD Eibar footballers
Zamudio SD players
Club Portugalete players
Real Zaragoza B players
Real Zaragoza players
SD Amorebieta footballers
Barakaldo CF footballers
Racing de Santander players
CD Atlético Baleares footballers